Juan Carlos Corazza (born 1959) is an Argentine acting teacher and theatre director based in Spain since the 1990s.

Biography 
Born in 1959 in Argentina, he was raised in Adelia María, in the province of Córdoba.

Some of his alumni include Javier Bardem, Elena Anaya, Silvia Abascal, Roberto Enríquez, Juana Acosta, Alba Flores, Alicia Borrachero, Sergio Peris-Mencheta, Alberto Ammann, Javier Godino, Manuela Velasco, and Pilar López de Ayala.

He was bestowed with the Special Award at the 27th Actors and Actresses Union Awards in 2018, by two of his students (Javier Bardem and Elena Anaya).

References 

Acting teachers
Argentine theatre directors
1959 births
Living people